Jorge Paula (born 8 October 1984) is a Portuguese hurdler who represented his country in the men's 400 metres hurdles at the 2012 Summer Olympics.

References

Living people
1984 births
Portuguese male hurdlers
Olympic athletes of Portugal
Athletes (track and field) at the 2012 Summer Olympics
World Athletics Championships athletes for Portugal
S.L. Benfica athletes